Five ships of the Royal Navy have been named HMS Monarch.

 , 74-gun third-rate ship of the line, originally the French Monarque, captured 1747 at the second battle of Cape Finisterre, sold and broken up 1760.  Admiral John Byng was executed on board in 1757.
 , 74-gun third rate; Vice Admiral Onslow's flagship at the Battle of Camperdown 1797; broken up 1813.
 , 84-gun second rate, broken up 1866.
 , ironclad masted turret ship, sold and broken up 1905.

Battle honours 

 St. Vincent 1780
 St. Kitts 1782
 The Saints 1782
 Cape of Good Hope 1795
 Camperdown 1797
 Copenhagen 1801
 Baltic 1854
 Alexandria 1882
 South Africa 1899-1900
 Jutland 1916

See also 
 HMS Monarca

References 
 Colledge, J. J. (1987) Ships of the Royal Navy: the complete record of all fighting ships of the Royal Navy from the fifteenth century to the present, London: Greenhill, 

Royal Navy ship names